The vanadium redox battery (VRB), also known as the vanadium flow battery (VFB) or vanadium redox flow battery (VRFB), is a type of rechargeable flow battery. It employs vanadium ions as charge carriers. The battery uses vanadium's ability to exist in a solution in four different oxidation states to make a battery with a single electroactive element instead of two. For several reasons, including their relative bulkiness, vanadium batteries are typically used for grid energy storage, i.e., attached to power plants/electrical grids.

Numerous companies and organizations are involved in funding and developing vanadium redox batteries.

History 
Pissoort explored the possibility of VRFB's in the 1930s. NASA researchers and Pellegri and Spaziante followed suit in the 1970s, but neither was successful. Maria Skyllas-Kazacos presented the first successful demonstration of dissolved vanadium in a solution of sulfuric acid in the 1980s. Her design used sulfuric acid electrolytes, and was patented by the University of New South Wales in Australia in 1986.

Advantages and disadvantages

Advantages
VRFB's main advantages over other types of battery:

 no limit on energy capacity
 can remain discharged indefinitely without damage
 mixing electrolytes causes no permanent damage
 single charge state across the electrolytes avoids capacity degradation
 safe, non-flammable aqueous electrolyte;
 wide operating temperature range including passive cooling 
 long charge/discharge cycle lives: 15,000-20,000 cycles and 10–20 years.
 low levelized cost: (a few tens of cents), approaching the 2016 $0.05 target stated by the US Department of Energy and the European Commission Strategic Energy Technology Plan €0.05 target.

Disadvantages
VRFB's main disadvantages compared to other types of battery:

 high and volatile prices of vanadium minerals (i.e. the cost of VRFB energy) ;
 relatively poor round trip efficiency (compared to lithium-ion batteries) ;
 heavy weight of aqueous electrolyte ;
 relatively poor energy-to-volume ratio compared to standard storage batteries ;
 toxicity of vanadium (V) compounds.

Materials

A vanadium redox battery consists of an assembly of power cells in which two electrolytes are separated by a proton exchange membrane. The electrodes in a VRB cell are carbon based. The most common types are carbon felt, carbon paper, carbon cloth, graphite felt, and carbon nanotubes.

Both electrolytes are vanadium-based. The electrolyte in the positive half-cells contains VO2+ and VO2+ ions, while the electrolyte in the negative half-cells consists of V3+ and V2+ ions. The electrolytes can be prepared by several processes, including electrolytically dissolving vanadium pentoxide (V2O5) in sulfuric acid (H2SO4). The solution is strongly acidic in use.

The most common membrane material is perfluorinated sulfonic acid (PFSA or Nafion). However, vanadium ions can penetrate a PFSA membrane and destabilize the cell. A 2021 study found that penetration is reduced with hybrid sheets made by growing tungsten trioxide nanoparticles on the surface of single-layered graphene oxide sheets. These hybrid sheets are then embedded into a sandwich structured PFSA membrane reinforced with polytetrafluoroethylene (Teflon). The nanoparticles also promote proton transport, offering high Coulombic efficiency and energy efficiency of more than 98.1 percent and 88.9 percent, respectively.

Operation 

The reaction uses the half-reactions:



Other useful properties of vanadium flow batteries are their fast response to changing loads and their overload capacities. They can achieve a response time of under half a millisecond for a 100% load change, and allow overloads of as much as 400% for 10 seconds. Response time is limited mostly by the electrical equipment. Unless specifically designed for colder or warmer climates, most sulfuric acid-based vanadium batteries work between about 10 and 40 °C. Below that temperature range, the ion-infused sulfuric acid crystallizes. Round trip efficiency in practical applications is around 70–80 %.

Proposed improvements
The original VRFB design by Skyllas-Kazacos employed sulfate (added as vanadium sulfate(s) and sulfuric acid) as the only anion in VRFB solutions, which limited the maximum vanadium concentration to 1.7 M of vanadium ions. Around 2010 a team from Pacific Northwest National Laboratory proposed a mixed sulfate-chloride electrolyte, that allowed for the use in VRFBs solutions with the vanadium concentration of 2.5 M over a whole temperature range between −20 and +50 °C. Based on the standard equilibrium potential of the V+5/V+4 couple it is expected to oxidize chloride, and for this reason chloride solutions were avoided in earlier VRFB studies. The surprising oxidative stability (albeit only at the state of charge below ca. 80%) of V+5 solutions in the presence of chloride was explained on the basis of activity coefficients. Nevertheless, because of a high vapor pressure of HCl solutions, such mixed electrolytes have not been widely adopted.

Another variation is the use of vanadium bromide salts. Since the redox potential of Br2/2Br- couple is more negative than that of V5+/4+, the positive electrode operates via the bromine process. However, due to problems with volatility and corrosivity of Br2, they did not gain much popularity (see zinc-bromine battery for a similar problem). A vanadium/cerium flow battery has also been proposed .

Specific energy and energy density
VRBs achieve a specific energy of about 20 Wh/kg (72 kJ/kg) of electrolyte. Precipitation inhibitors can increase the density to about 35 Wh/kg (126 kJ/kg), with higher densities possible by controlling the electrolyte temperature. The specific energy is low compared to other rechargeable battery types (e.g., lead–acid, 30–40 Wh/kg (108–144 kJ/kg); and lithium ion, 80–200 Wh/kg (288–720 kJ/kg)). Precipitation inhibitors can elevate VRBs to match lead-acid batteries.

Applications
VRFB's large potential capacity may be best-suited to buffer the irregular output of utility-scale wind and solar systems.

Their reduced self-discharge makes them potentially appropriate in applications that require long-term energy storage with little maintenance—as in military equipment, such as the sensor components of the GATOR mine system.

They feature rapid response times well suited to uninterruptible power supply (UPS) applications, where they can replace lead–acid batteries or diesel generators. Fast response time is also beneficial for frequency regulation. These capabilities make VRBF's an effective "all-in-one" solution for microgrids, frequency regulation and load shifting.

Largest vanadium grid batteries

Companies funding or developing vanadium redox batteries
Companies include Sumitomo Electric Industries, CellCube (Enerox), UniEnergy Technologies, StorEn Technologies, Largo Energy and Ashlawn Energy in the United States; H2 in South Korea; Renewable Energy Dynamics Technology, Invinity Energy and VoltStorage in Europe; Prudent Energy in China; Australian Vanadium in Australia; EverFlow Energy JV SABIC SCHMID Group in Saudi Arabia and Bushveld Minerals in South Africa.

See also

 List of battery types
 Polysulfide bromide battery
 Electric battery
 Fuel cell
 Energy storage

Citations

General and cited references 
  Presentation paper from the IEEE summer 2001 conference
 UNSW Site on Vanadium batteries
 Report by World Energy
 World Map Of Global Vanadium Deposits Vanadium geology is fairly unusual compared to a base metals ore body.

External links 

 The U.S. made a breakthrough battery discovery — then gave the technology to China The U.S. made a breakthrough battery discovery — then gave the technology to China
 VRFB developments at UNSW
 VRB at everything2
 The Need for Vanadium Redox Energy Storage in Wind Turbine Generators—Net electricity generation from all forms of renewable energies in America increased by over 15% between 2005 and 2009
 redT and Avalon have merged as Invinity Energy Systems, a global leader in Vanadium Flow Batteries

Flow batteries
Grid energy storage
Vanadium